Thomastown is an unincorporated community in Leake County, Mississippi, United States.

History
Thomastown was incorporated in 1854 and disincorporated at an unknown date.

The community is located on the Yockanookany River and in 1900 had a population of 54.

Thomastown has a post office with ZIP code 39171, which opened on May 17, 1933.

Thomastown was once home to a masonic lodge, Thomastown Lodge No. 124.

References

Unincorporated communities in Leake County, Mississippi
Unincorporated communities in Mississippi